Durham is a city in the U.S. state of North Carolina and the county seat of Durham County. Small portions of the city limits extend into Orange County and Wake County. With a population of 283,506 in the 2020 census, Durham is the 4th-most populous city in North Carolina, and the 74th-most populous city in the United States. The city is located in the east-central part of the Piedmont region along the Eno River. Durham is the core of the four-county Durham-Chapel Hill Metropolitan Area, which had a population of 649,903 at the 2020 census. The Office of Management and Budget also includes Durham as a part of the Raleigh-Durham-Cary Combined Statistical Area, commonly known as the Research Triangle, which had a population of  2,043,867 at the 2020 census.

A railway depot was established in 1849 on land donated by Bartlett S. Durham, the namesake of the city. Following the American Civil War, the community of Durham Station expanded rapidly, in part due to the tobacco industry. The town was incorporated by act of the North Carolina General Assembly, in April 1869. The establishment of Durham County was ratified by the General Assembly 12 years later, in 1881. It became known as the founding place and headquarters of the American Tobacco Company. Textile and electric power industries also played an important role. While these industries have declined, Durham underwent revitalization and population growth to become an educational, medical, and research center.

Durham is home to several recognized institutions of higher education, most notably Duke University and North Carolina Central University. Durham is also a national leader in health-related activities, which are focused on the Duke University Hospital and many private companies. Duke and its Duke University Health System are the largest employers in the city. North Carolina Central University is a historically black university that is part of the University of North Carolina system. Together, the two universities make Durham one of the vertices of the Research Triangle area; central to this is the Research Triangle Park south of Durham, which encompasses an area of 11 square miles and is devoted to research facilities.

On the Duke University campus are the neo-Gothic Duke Chapel and the Nasher Museum of Art. Other notable sites in the city include the Museum of Life and Science, Durham Performing Arts Center, Carolina Theatre, and Duke Homestead and Tobacco Factory. Bennett Place commemorates the location where Joseph E. Johnston surrendered to William T. Sherman in the American Civil War. The city is served, along with Raleigh, by Raleigh–Durham International Airport.

History

Pre-establishment
The Eno and the Occoneechi, related to the Sioux and the Shakori, lived and farmed in the area which became Durham. They may have established a village named Adshusheer on the site. The Great Indian Trading Path has been traced through Durham, and Native Americans helped to mold the area by establishing settlements and commercial transportation routes.

In 1701, Durham's beauty was chronicled by the English explorer John Lawson, who called the area "the flower of the Carolinas." During the mid-1700s, Scots, Irish, and English colonists settled on land granted to George Carteret by King Charles I (for whom the Carolinas are named). Early settlers built gristmills, such as West Point, and worked the land.

Prior to the American Revolution, frontiersmen in what is now Durham were involved in the Regulator movement. According to legend, Loyalist militia cut Cornwallis Road through this area in 1771 to quell the rebellion. Later, William Johnston, a local shopkeeper and farmer, made Revolutionaries' munitions, served in the Provincial Capital Congress in 1775, and helped underwrite Daniel Boone's westward explorations.

Antebellum and Civil War
Prior to the arrival of the railroad, the area now known as Durham was the eastern part of present-day Orange County and was almost entirely agricultural, with a few businesses catering to travelers (particularly livestock drivers) along the Hillsborough Road. This road, eventually followed by US Route 70, was the major east–west route in North Carolina from colonial times until the construction of interstate highways. Steady population growth and an intersection with the road connecting Roxboro and Fayetteville made the area near this site suitable for a US Post Office. Roxboro, Fayetteville and Hillsborough Roads remain major thoroughfares in Durham, although they no longer exactly follow their early 19th century rights-of-way.

Large plantations, Hardscrabble, Fairntosh, Lipscomb, Patterson, and Leigh among them, were established in the antebellum period. By 1860, Stagville Plantation lay at the center of one of the largest plantation holdings in the South. African slaves were brought to labor on these farms and plantations, and slave quarters became the hearth of distinctively Southern cultural traditions involving crafts, social relations, life rituals, music, and dance. There were free African-Americans in the area as well, including several who fought in the Revolutionary War.

Durham's location is a result of the needs of the 19th century railroad industry. The wood-burning steam locomotives of the time had to stop frequently for wood and water and the new North Carolina Railroad needed a depot between the settled towns of Raleigh and Hillsborough. The residents of what is now downtown Durham thought their businesses catering to livestock drivers had a better future than "a new-fangled nonsense like a railroad" and refused to sell or lease land for a depot. In 1849, a North Carolina Railroad depot was established on a four-acre tract of land donated by Dr. Bartlett S. Durham; the station was named after him in recognition of his gift. A U.S. post office was established there on April 26, 1853, now recognized as the city's official birthday.

Durham Station, as it was known for its first 20 years, was a depot for the occasional passenger or express package until early April 1865, when the Federal Army commanded by Major General William T. Sherman occupied the nearby state capital of Raleigh during the American Civil War. The last formidable Confederate Army in the South, commanded by General Joseph E. Johnston, was headquartered in Greensboro  to the west.

As both armies passed through Durham, Hillsborough, and surrounding Piedmont communities, they enjoyed the mild flavor of the area's Brightleaf tobacco, which was considered more pleasant to smoke or chew than was available back home after the war. Some began sending letters to Durham to get more.

Reconstruction and the rise of Durham tobacco
 

The community of Durham Station grew slowly before the Civil War, but expanded rapidly following the war. Much of this growth attributed to the establishment of a thriving tobacco industry. Veterans returned home after the war with an interest in acquiring more of the tobacco they had sampled in North Carolina. Numerous orders were mailed to John Ruffin Green's tobacco company requesting more of the Durham tobacco. W.T. Blackwell partnered with Green and renamed the company as the "Bull Durham Tobacco Factory". The name "Bull Durham" is said to have been taken from the bull on the British Colman's Mustard, which Mr. Blackwell mistakenly believed was manufactured in Durham, England. Mustard known as Durham Mustard was originally produced in Durham, England, by Mrs Clements and later by Ainsley during the eighteenth century. However, production of the original Durham Mustard has now been passed into the hands of Colman's of Norwich, England.

Incorporation
As Durham Station's population rapidly increased, the station became a town and was incorporated by act of the North Carolina General Assembly, on April 10, 1869. It was named for the man who provided the land on which the station was built, Dr. Bartlett Durham. At the time of its incorporation by the General Assembly, Durham was located in Orange County. The increase in business activity, land transfers etc., made the day long trip back and forth to the county seat in Hillsborough untenable, so twelve years later, on April 17, 1881, a bill for the establishment of Durham County was ratified by the General Assembly, having been introduced by Caleb B.Green, creating Durham County from the eastern portion of Orange County and the western portion of Wake County. In 1911, parts of Cedar Fork Township of Wake County was transferred to Durham County and became Carr Township.

Early growth (1900–1970)

The rapid growth and prosperity of the Bull Durham Tobacco Company, and Washington Duke's W. Duke & Sons Tobacco Company, resulted in the rapid growth of the city of Durham. Washington Duke was a good businessman, but his sons were brilliant and established what amounted to a monopoly of the smoking and chewing tobacco business in the United States by 1900. In the early 1910s, the Federal Government forced a breakup of the Duke's business under the antitrust laws. The Dukes retained what became known as American Tobacco, a major corporation in its own right, with manufacturing based in Durham. American Tobacco's ubiquitous advertisements on radio shows beginning in the 1930s and television shows up to 1970 was the nation's image of Durham until Duke University supplanted it in the late 20th century.

Prevented from further investment in the tobacco industry, the Dukes turned to the then new industry of electric power generation, which they had been investing in since the early 1890s. Duke Power (now Duke Energy) brought in electricity from hydroelectric dams in the western mountains of North Carolina through the newly invented technology of high voltage power lines. At this time (1910–1920), the few towns and cities in North Carolina that had electricity depended on local "powerhouses". These were large, noisy, and smoky coal-fired plants located next to the railroad tracks. Duke Power quickly took over the electricity franchises in these towns and then electrified all the other towns of central and western North Carolina, making even more money than they ever made from tobacco. Duke Power also had a significant business in local franchises for public transit (buses and trolleys) before local government took over this responsibility in the mid- to late 20th century. Duke Power ran Durham's public bus system (now the Durham Area Transit Authority) until 1991.

The success of the tobacco industry in the late 19th and early 20th century encouraged the then-growing textile industry to locate just outside Durham. The early electrification of Durham was also a large incentive. Drawing a labor force from the economic demise of single family farms in the region at the time, these textile mills doubled the population of Durham. These areas were known as East Durham and West Durham until they were eventually annexed by the City of Durham.

Much of the early city architecture, both commercial and residential, dates from the period of 1890–1930. Durham recorded its worst fire in history on March 23, 1914. The multimillion-dollar blaze destroyed a large portion of the downtown business district. The fire department's water source failed during the blaze, prompting voters to establish a city-owned water system in place of the private systems that had served the city since 1887.

Durham quickly developed a black community, the center of which was an area known as Hayti, (pronounced HAY-tie), just south of the center of town, where some of the most prominent and successful black-owned businesses in the country during the early 20th century were established. These businesses — the best known of which are North Carolina Mutual Life Insurance Company and Mechanics & Farmers Bank — were centered on Parrish St., which would come to be known as "Black Wall Street." In 1910, Dr. James E. Shepard founded North Carolina Central University, the nation's first publicly supported liberal arts college for African-Americans.

In 1924, James Buchanan Duke established a philanthropic foundation in honor of his father Washington Duke to support Trinity College in Durham. The college changed its name to Duke University and built a large campus and hospital a mile west of Trinity College (the original site of Trinity College is now known as the Duke East Campus).

Durham's manufacturing fortunes declined during the mid-20th century. Textile mills began to close during the 1930s. Competition from other tobacco companies (as well as a decrease in smoking after the 1960s) reduced revenues from Durham's tobacco industry.

In a far-sighted move in the late 1950s, Duke University, along with the University of North Carolina in Chapel Hill and North Carolina State University in Raleigh, persuaded the North Carolina Legislature to purchase a large tract of sparsely settled land in southern Durham County and create the nation's first "science park" for industry. Cheap land and a steady supply of trained workers from the local universities made the Research Triangle Park an enormous success which, along with the expansion resulting from the clinical and scientific advances of Duke Medical Center and Duke University, more than made up for the decline of Durham's tobacco and textile industries.

Civil Rights Movement
As a result of its substantial African-American community, including many activists, a prominent civil rights movement developed in Durham. Multiple sit-ins were held, and Martin Luther King Jr., visited the city during the struggle for equal rights. The Durham Committee on Negro Affairs, organized in 1935 by C.C. Spaulding, Louis Austin, Conrad Pearson, and James E. Shepard, has been cited nationally for its role in fighting for black voting rights. The committee also has used its voting strength to pursue social and economic rights for African-Americans and other ethnic groups. In 1957, Douglas E. Moore, minister of Durham's Asbury Temple Methodist Church, along with other religious and community leaders, pioneered sit-ins throughout North Carolina to protest discrimination at lunch counters that served only whites.

Widely credited as the first sit-in of the Civil Rights Movement in North Carolina, on June 23, 1957, Moore and six others assembled at the church to plan the protest. The young African Americans moved over to the segregated Royal Ice Cream Parlor and took up whites-only booths. When they refused to budge, the manager called the police who charged them with trespassing. Unlike the Greensboro Four, three years later, the Royal Seven were arrested and ultimately found guilty of trespassing.

The six-month-long sit-in at a Woolworth's counter in Greensboro, NC, captured the nation's attention. Within a week, students from North Carolina College at Durham and Duke University staged a sit-in in Durham. About a week later, Martin Luther King Jr. met Moore in Durham, where King coined his famous rallying cry "Fill up the jails," during a speech at White Rock Baptist Church. Advocating non-violent confrontation with segregation laws for the first time, King said, "Let us not fear going to jail. If the officials threaten to arrest us for standing up for our rights, we must answer by saying that we are willing and prepared to fill up the jails of the South."

This community was not enough to prevent the demolition of portions of the Hayti district for the construction of the Durham Freeway during the late 1960s. The freeway construction resulted in losses to other historic neighborhoods, including Morehead Hill, West End, and West Durham. Combined with large-scale demolition using Urban Renewal funds, Durham suffered significant losses to its historic architectural base.

1970s – present

In 1970, the Census Bureau reported city's population as 38.8% black and 60.8% white. Durham's growth began to rekindle during the 1970s and 1980s, with the construction of multiple housing developments in the southern part of the city, nearest Research Triangle Park, and the beginnings of downtown revitalization. In 1975, the St. Joseph's Historical Foundation at the Hayti Heritage Center was incorporated to "preserve the heritage of the old Hayti community, and to promote the understanding of and appreciation for the African American experience and African Americans' contributions to world culture." A new downtown baseball stadium was constructed for the Durham Bulls in 1994. The Durham Performing Arts Center now ranks in the top ten in theater ticket sales in the US according to Pollstar magazine. Many famous people have performed there including B.B. King and Willie Nelson. After the departure of the tobacco industry, large-scale renovations of the historic factories into offices, condominiums, and restaurants began to reshape downtown. While these efforts continue, the large majority of Durham's residential and retail growth since 1990 has been along the I-40 corridor in southern Durham County.

These centers are connected by the Durham Freeway (NC 147).

Downtown revitalization

In recent years the city of Durham has stepped up revitalization of its downtown and undergone an economic and cultural renaissance of sorts. Partnering with developers from around the world, the city continues to promote the redevelopment of many of its former tobacco districts, projects supplemented by the earlier construction of the Durham Performing Arts Center and new Durham Bulls Athletic Park. The American Tobacco Historic District, adjacent to both the athletic park and performing arts center, is one such project, having successfully lured a number of restaurants, entertainment venues, and office space geared toward hi-tech entrepreneurs, investors, and startups. Many other companies have purchased and renovated historic buildings, such as Measurement Incorporated and Capitol Broadcasting Company.
The American Underground section of the American Tobacco Campus, home to successful small software firms including Red Hat, was selected by Google to host its launch of the Google Glass Road show in October 2013. The district is also slated for expansion featuring 158,000 square feet of offices, retail, residential or hotel space The Durham County Justice Center, a major addition to downtown Durham, was completed in early 2013.

Many of the historic tobacco buildings elsewhere in the city have been converted into loft-style apartment complexes. The downtown corridor along West Main St. has seen significant redevelopment including bars, entertainment venues, art studios, and co-working spaces, in addition to shopping and dining in nearby Brightleaf Square, another former tobacco warehouse in the Bright Leaf Historic District. Other current and future projects include expansion of the open-space surrounding the American Tobacco Trail, new hotels and apartment complexes, a $6.35-million facelift of Durham City Hall, and ongoing redevelopment of the Duke University Central Campus.

In 2013, 21c Museum Hotels announced plans to fully renovate the Hill Building. The renovations added a contemporary art museum and upscale restaurant to the historic building. Additionally, a boutique hotel was built in this major renovation effort in downtown Durham. Skanska is responsible for managing this project.

In 2014, it was announced that downtown Durham would be the site of a brand new 27 story high building, tentatively named "City Center Tower", titled "One City Center" . Along with other new buildings in downtown Durham, it was under construction in 2018. Construction has already started, and the building will be at the corner of Main St. and Corcoran St. It will be directly across from Durham's current tallest building, but once completed, will be the new tallest building in downtown Durham and the 4th largest building in the Triangle. Originally scheduled for a 2016 opening, the building was then expected to open in May 2018. This is an ambitious, $80 million project.

In October 2014, a major new development, the Durham Innovation District, was announced. The development will span 15 acres and comprise over 1.7 million square feet of office, residential, and retail space.

On April 10, 2019, a gas explosion rocked Kaffeinate, a coffee shop in Bright Leaf Historic District. The blast destroyed a city block and killed Kong Lee, the owner, as well as injuring 25 others.

Geography

Durham is located in the east-central part of the Piedmont region at  (35.988644, −78.907167). Like much of the region, its topography is generally flat with some rolling hills.

The soil is predominantly clay, making it poor for agriculture. The Eno River, a tributary of the Neuse River, passes through the northern part of Durham, along with several other small creeks. The center of Durham is on a ridge that forms the divide between the Neuse River watershed, flowing east to Pamlico Sound, and the Cape Fear River watershed, flowing south to the Atlantic near Wilmington. A small portion of the city is in Wake County.

Durham is located 10.41 miles northeast of Chapel Hill, 20.78 miles northwest of Raleigh, 50.21 miles east of Greensboro, 121.40 miles northeast of Charlotte and 134.06 miles southwest of Richmond, Virginia.

Cityscape

Climate
Durham is classified as a humid subtropical climate (Cfa) according to the Köppen classification, with hot and humid summers, cool winters, and warm to mild spring and autumn.

Durham consistently ranks in the top 10 least challenging places to live with seasonal allergies. 

Climate change is expected to increase the number of days of extreme precipitation in Durham as well as moderately increase temperature within the region. The number of days of inland flooding within the Piedmont is also expected to increase, which puts Durham at higher risk of future flooding.  High intensity short duration storms are predicted to grow in frequency to upwards of 9 days a year by 2100. Inland flooding is anticipated to have a greater impact on the elderly and other at-risk groups in Durham.

Demographics

2020 census

Note: the US Census treats Hispanic/Latino as an ethnic category. This table excludes Latinos from the racial categories and assigns them to a separate category. Hispanics/Latinos can be of any race.

As of the 2020 United States census, there were 283,506 people, 114,726 households, and 64,982 families residing in the city.

2010 census
As of the 2010 census, there were 228,330 people, 93,441 households, and 52,409 families residing in the city. The population density was 2,406.0 people per square mile (928.9/km2). There were 103,221 housing units at an average density of 1,087.7 per square mile (419.9/km2). The racial composition of the city was: 42.45% White, 40.96% Black or African American, 5.07% Asian American, 0.51% Native American, 0.07% Native Hawaiian or Other Pacific Islander, 8.28% some other race, and 2.66% two or more races; 14.22% were Hispanic or Latino of any race. Non-Hispanic White comprised 37.9% of the population.

Durham's population, as of July 1, 2019 and according to the 2019 US census data estimate, had grown to 278,993, making it the 50th fastest growing city in the US, and the 2nd fastest growing city in North Carolina, behind Cary but ahead of Charlotte, Raleigh and Greensboro.

There were 93,441 households, out of which 27.5% had children under the age of 18 living with them, 36.2% were married couples living together, 15.5% had a female householder with no husband present, and 43.9% were non-families. 33.7% of all households were made up of individuals, and 7.0% had someone living alone who was 65 years of age or older. The average household size was 2.34, and the average family size was 3.04.

In the city, the population was spread out, with 22.7% under the age of 18, 14.1% from 18 to 24, 33.6% from 25 to 44, 21.8% from 45 to 64, and 8.9% who were 65 years of age or older. The median age was 32.1 years. For every 100 females, there were 92.5 males. For every 100 females age 18 and over, there were 86.9 males.

The median income for a household in the city was $47,394, and the median income for a family was $60,157. Males had a median income of $35,202 versus $30,359 for females. The per capita income for the city was $27,156. About 13.1% of families and 18.6% of the population were below the poverty line, including 24.3% of those under age 18 and 10.1% of those age 65 or over.

Economy

Duke University and Duke University Health System are Durham's largest employers. Below is a list of Durham's largest employers.

Healthcare and pharmaceuticals continue to grow in importance with many companies based in Durham including IQVIA, Aerie Pharmaceuticals, Chimerix, BioCryst Pharmaceuticals, Bio Products Laboratory USA, bioMérieux USA and North Carolina Biotechnology Center.

Other prominent companies based in Durham include Center for Community Self-Help, Liggett Group, North Carolina Mutual Life Insurance Company, American Institute of Certified Public Accountants, Bronto Software, Counter Culture Coffee, Burt's Bees, McKinney (advertising agency), Sugar Hill Records, Mechanics and Farmers Bank, Southern Express.

Arts and culture
Durham is the venue for the annual Bull Durham Blues Festival and the OUTsouth Queer Film Festival, the 2nd largest LGBTQ+ film festival in the Southeast. Other events include jazz festivals, plays, symphony concerts, art exhibitions, and a multitude of cultural expositions, including the American Dance Festival, Tobacco Road Dance, and the Full Frame Documentary Film Festival. A center of Durham's culture is its Carolina Theatre, which presents concerts, comedy and arts in historic Fletcher Hall and Independent and repertory film in its cinemas. There is a resurgence of restaurants in and around the downtown area, including several new restaurants in the American Tobacco District. The Nasher Museum of Art opened in October 2005 and has produced nationally recognized traveling exhibitions of global, contemporary art.

Durham also boasts an outstanding history museum, the Museum of Durham History. In 2019, the museum hosted several exhibits, including one on journalist and civil rights activist Louis Austin, and in conjunction with the 150th anniversary of the city of Durham, an exhibit titled, "150 Faces of Durham", which highlighted many of the women and men who influenced the history of Durham.

The Durham Association for Downtown Arts (DADA) is a non-profit arts organization located in the downtown area. It was founded in 1998 and then incorporated in 2000. The organization's mission is a commitment to the development, presentation and fiscal sponsorship of original art and performance in Durham. DADA strives to support local artists working in a diversity of artistic media. Emphasizing community, DADA helps local residents gain access to these artists by providing free or low-cost venue admission.

Movies such as Bull Durham (1988) and The Handmaid's Tale (1989) have been shot in Durham.

Music
Durham has an active and diverse local music culture. Artists' styles range from jazz, hip-hop, soul, folk, Americana, blues, bluegrass, punk, metal and rock. Popular bands and musicians include Branford Marsalis, Iron & Wine, Carolina Chocolate Drops, The Mountain Goats, John Dee Holeman, 9th Wonder, Red Clay Ramblers, The Old Ceremony, Megafaun, Curtis Eller, Mount Moriah, Hiss Golden Messenger, Sylvan Esso, Mel Melton, Hammer No More the Fingers, Yahzarah, G Yamazawa, and Jim Mills. Members of The Butchies, Superchunk, Chatham County Line, Alice Donut, and the Avett Brothers live in Durham.

Merge Records, a successful independent record label, has its headquarters in downtown Durham. Other independent record labels include Jamla, 307 Knox, Churchkey Records, and Paradise of Bachelors. Roots label Sugar Hill Records was founded in Durham, by Barry Lyle Poss, before it moved to Nashville in 1998. In 1996, the feminist / queer record label Mr. Lady Records was founded and operated in Durham until its demise in 2004.

Duke University's radio station WXDU is an active participant in the community. WNCU, which is supported in part by NPR, is a jazz focused FM radio station, with broadcast studios on the campus of NCCU.

The music album Sandham: Symphony Meets Classical Tamil by composer Rajan Somasundaram made in association with Academy nominated singer Bombay Jayashri and Durham Symphony (led by William Henry Curry) became Amazon's Top#10 bestseller under 'International Music album' category in 2020.

Durham has a rich history of African American rhythm and blues, soul, and funk music. In the 1960s and 1970s, more than 40 R&B, soul, and funk groups—including The Modulations, The Black Experience Band, The Communicators, and Duralcha—recorded over 30 singles and three full-length albums. Durham was also home to ten recording labels that released soul music, though most of them only released one or two records apiece. A few successful local soul groups from Durham also recorded on national labels like United Artists or on regional labels in the mid-Atlantic and Northeast.

Visual arts
Durham is home to the Nasher Museum of Art and smaller visual arts galleries and studios. Downtown Durham sponsors a celebration of culture and arts on display every third Friday of the month, year round. The event has come to be known as 3rd Friday.

A selection of locally renowned galleries remain in business throughout the city. Galleries include but are not limited to local spots such as the Pleiades Gallery, the Carrack Modern Art, and Golden Belt Studios. Supporting a variety of local, nationwide, and worldwide talent, these galleries often host weekly events and art shows. The Durham Art Walk is another annual arts festival hosted in May each year in downtown Durham. The Durham Art Walk features a variety of artists that come together each year for a large showcase of work in the streets of Durham. A secondary magnet school, Durham School of the Arts, is also located in downtown Durham. It focuses on providing education in various forms of art ranging from visual to the performing arts.

Sports

Collegiate athletics are a primary focus in Durham. Duke University's men's basketball team draws a large following, selling out every home game at Cameron Indoor Stadium since 1990. The fans are known as the Cameron Crazies and are known nationwide for their chants and rowdiness. The team has won the NCAA Division I championship three times since 2001 and five times overall. Duke competes in a total of 27 sports in the Atlantic Coast Conference.

Durham's professional sports team is the Durham Bulls International League baseball team. A movie involving an earlier Carolina League team of that name, Bull Durham, was produced in 1988. Today's Bulls play in the Durham Bulls Athletic Park, on the southern end of downtown, constructed in 1994. One of the more successful teams in the minor leagues, the Bulls usually generate an annual attendance of around 500,000. Previously Durham Athletic Park (DAP), located on the northern end of downtown, had served as the Bull's ballpark. Historically, many players for the current and former Durham Bulls teams have transferred to the big leagues after several years in the minor leagues. DAP has been preserved for the use of other teams as well as for concerts sponsored by the City of Durham and other events. The Durham Dragons, a women's fast pitch softball team, played in the Durham Athletic Park from 1998 to 2000. The DAP recently went through a $5 million renovation.

Government

The area is predominantly Democratic, and has voted for the Democratic Party's presidential candidate in every election since the city's founding in 1869. Durham County is the most liberal county in North Carolina, measured by the percentage of voters aligning with the Democratic party in the last several presidential elections, such as 2008. The shifting alliances of the area's political action committees since the 1980s has led to a very active local political scene. Notable groups include the Durham Committee on the Affairs of Black People, the Durham People's Alliance, and the Friends of Durham. The first two groups tend to be affiliated with Democratic party progressive activists, while the third group tends to attract Republican activists. Compared to other similarly sized Southern cities, Durham has a larger than average population of middle class African-Americans and white liberals. Working together in coalition, these two groups have dominated city and county politics since the early 1980s.

Durham operates under a council-manager government. The mayor, since 2017, was Steve Schewel, who was elected with 59.45% of the vote. The seven-member City Council is the primary budgetary and lawmaking authority. In November 2021, Elaine O'Neal was elected as the new mayor of Durham, becoming the first black female mayor in the city.

Key political issues have been the redevelopment of Downtown Durham and revival of other historic neighborhoods and commercial districts, ending cash bail, ending mandatory sentencing minimums, decriminalization of marijuana, raising minimum wage for city employees to $15, the fluoridation of public drinking water, a 45% reduction of crime, a 10-year plan to end homelessness, initiatives to reduce truancy, issues related to growth and development. Naturally, a merger of Durham City Schools (several inner city neighborhoods) and Durham County Schools in the early 1990s has not been without controversy. More recently, the Durham City Council's 2018 statement opposing militarized policing that mentioned Israel has drawn its third lawsuit. In 2018, Durham appointed its first Latino council member Javiera Caballero. Durham has had majority female county boards since the 1980s, and in 2020, Durham elected, for the first time, an all female Durham County Board of Commissioners and the first Muslim-American woman to win elected office in the history of North Carolina.

Federally, Durham is in North Carolina's 4th congressional district, which is represented by Democrat Valerie Foushee.

Since 2003 the city has had a policy to prohibit police from inquiring into the citizenship status of persons unless they have otherwise been arrested or charged with a crime. A city council resolution mandates that police officers "...may not request specific documents for the sole purpose of determining a person's civil immigration status, and may not initiate police action based solely on a person's civil immigration status ..." Since 2010, the Durham police have accepted the Mexican Consular Identification Card as a valid form of identification.

In 2006, racial and community tensions stirred following false allegations of a sexual assault by three white members of the Duke University lacrosse team in what is now known as the 2006 Duke University lacrosse case. The allegations were made by Crystal Gail Mangum, a young female African-American student and mother of two children. She and another young woman had been hired to dance at a party that the team held in an off-campus house. In 2007, all charges in the case were dropped and the players were declared innocent. Durham County District Attorney Mike Nifong was dismissed from his job and disbarred from legal practice for his criminal misconduct handling of the case, including withholding of exculpatory evidence. There have been several other results from the case, including lawsuits against both city and Duke University officials.

The new Durham County Justice Center was completed in early 2013.

Education

Primary and secondary schools
Public schools in Durham are run by Durham Public Schools, the eighth largest school district in North Carolina. The district runs 46 public schools, consisting of 30 elementary, 10 middle, 2 secondary, and 12 high schools. Several magnet high schools focus on distinct subject areas, such as the Durham School of the Arts and the City of Medicine Academy. Public schools in Durham were partially segregated until 1970.

The North Carolina School for Science and Mathematics is a boarding high school operated by the University of North Carolina in central Durham. The residential school accepts rising juniors living in North Carolina with a focus on science, mathematics, and technology.

There are several charter school options as well, including Research Triangle High School (a STEM school in Research Triangle Park), Voyager Academy (K-12), Kestrel Heights School (K-12), Maureen Joy Charter School (K-8), and most recently Excelsior Classical Academy (K-8).

Several private schools operate in Durham, such as Durham Academy, Triangle Day School, and The Duke School. There are also religious schools, including Carolina Friends School, Trinity School of Durham and Chapel Hill, Cristo Rey Research Triangle High School, Immaculata Catholic School, and Durham Nativity School.

In December 2007, Forbes.com ranked Durham as one of the "Top 20 Places to Educate Your Child;" Durham was the only MSA from North Carolina to make the list.

Colleges and universities 

Duke University has approximately 14,000 students, split evenly between graduates and undergraduates. Duke forms one of the three vertices of the Research Triangle along with the University of North Carolina at Chapel Hill and North Carolina State University. The university's research, medical, and teaching efforts are all among the highest-ranked in both the United States and the world.

North Carolina Central University is a public, historically black university located in southeastern Durham. It was ranked the number 1 Public HBCU in the nation by U.S. News & World Report in 2010 and 2011. It was ranked the 10th best HBCU overall. The university was founded by James E. Shepard in 1910 as the National Religious Training School and Chautauqua to address the needs of the region's black population, and now grants baccalaureate, master's, professional and doctoral degrees. NCCU became a university in 1969 and joined the University of North Carolina system in 1972.

Durham Technical Community College is a two-year public institution that grants associate degrees.

Media

The major daily newspaper in Durham is The Herald-Sun, which began publication in 1893. The Durham-based Independent Weekly, noted for its progressive/liberal perspective, provides political and entertainment news for the greater Research Triangle; it began publication in 1983. Duke's independent student newspaper, The Chronicle, also provides local coverage.

Durham is part of the Raleigh-Durham-Fayetteville designated market area, the 24th largest broadcast television market in the United States. ABC owned and operated WTVD is licensed to and based in Durham, while the studios for statewide public television service UNC-TV are based in Research Triangle Park. All major U.S. television networks have affiliates serving the region.

The city is part of the Raleigh-Durham Arbitron radio market, ranked No. 37 nationally. National Public Radio affiliate WUNC, based in Chapel Hill, has significant operations in Durham.

Infrastructure

Transportation

Most travel in Durham is by private motor vehicle on its network of public streets and highways. Important arteries for traffic include NC 147, which connects Duke University, downtown, and Research Triangle Park, U.S. 15-501 between Durham and Chapel Hill, I-85, connecting Durham to Virginia and western North Carolina cities, and I-40 running across southern Durham County between the Research Triangle Park and Chapel Hill. The I-40 corridor has been the main site of commercial and residential development in Durham since its opening in the early 1990s. Over 95% of commuters use a car to get to work, with 14% of those people in carpools.

Durham maintains an extensive network of bicycle routes and trails and has been recognized with a Bicycle Friendly Community Award. The American Tobacco Trail begins in downtown and continues south through Research Triangle Park and ends in Wake County. The city is also considering furthering the progress on the Triangle Greenway System.

Air travel is serviced by Raleigh-Durham International Airport, 12 miles southeast of Durham, which enplanes about 4.5 million passengers per year. Frequent service (five flights a day or more) is available to Boston, Charlotte, Philadelphia, New York LaGuardia, New York Kennedy, Newark, Washington Reagan, Washington Dulles, Chicago O'Hare, Dallas, Houston, and Atlanta, GA. Non-stop daily service is provided to approximately 30 destinations in the United States and daily international service is also available to London Heathrow, Toronto-Pearson and Paris Charles de Gaulle.

Amtrak operates a daily train between Charlotte and New York City (the Carolinian) which stops in downtown Durham. The State of North Carolina, in cooperation with Amtrak, operates three additional daily trains between Raleigh and Charlotte which also stop in Durham. A new Amtrak station was built in 2011 in a former tobacco warehouse. Some of the downtown streets cross the tracks at grade level, while other intersections have grade separation. One downtown railroad underpass has attracted national media coverage, because it provides only 11 feet-8 inches of clearance, and has damaged the roofs of many trucks. As of October 26, 2019, the underpass was closed down to both automotive and train traffic in preparation for raising it to 12 feet and 4 inches, so as to provide clearance underneath to reduce large vehicle damage.

National bus service is provided by Greyhound and Megabus at the Durham Transit Station in downtown Durham, which opened in 2009. GoDurham provides municipal bus service.

GoTriangle offers scheduled, fixed-route regional and commuter bus service between Raleigh and the region's other principal cities of Durham, Cary and Chapel Hill, as well as to and from the Raleigh-Durham International Airport, Research Triangle Park and several of the region's larger suburban communities. GoTriangle also coordinates an extensive vanpool and rideshare program that serves the region's larger employers and commute destinations.

From 1995, the cornerstone of GoTriangle's long-term plan was a  rail corridor from northeast Raleigh, through downtown Raleigh, Cary, and Research Triangle Park, to Durham using DMU technology. There were proposals to extend this corridor  to Chapel Hill with light rail technology. However, in 2006 Triangle Transit deferred implementation indefinitely when the Federal Transit Administration declined to fund the program. Government agencies throughout the Raleigh-Durham metropolitan area have struggled with determining the best means of providing fixed-rail transit service for the region.

The region's two metropolitan planning organizations appointed a group of local citizens in 2007 to reexamine options for future transit development in light of Triangle Transit's problems. The Special Transit Advisory Commission (STAC) retained many of the provisions of Triangle Transit's original plan, but recommended adding new bus services and raising additional revenues by adding a new local half-cent sales tax to fund the project.

Duke University also maintains its own transit system, Duke Transit operates more than 30 buses with routes throughout the campus and health system. Duke campus buses and vans have alternate schedules or do not operate during breaks and holidays.

In an effort to create safer roadways for vehicles, bicyclists, and pedestrians, drivers can enroll in Durham's Pace Car Program and agree to drive the speed limit, stop at all stop signs, stop at all red lights, and stop to let pedestrians cross the street.

Notable people

 Blind Boy Fuller (Fulton Allen), musician
 Louis Austin (1898–1971), journalist, civil rights leader
 Ernie Barnes, artist/painter
 Kara Medoff Barnett, theater producer, arts director
 Samuel Beam, singer/songwriter from Iron & Wine, current resident
 Ben Brantley, The New York Times theater critic
 Andrew Britton, novelist 
 Mic'hael Brooks, NFL player
 Little Brother, hip-hop group
 Kelly Bruno, world-record holding amputee runner and athlete; contestant on reality TV show Survivor: Nicaragua
 Dan Bryk, singer, rock star
 Shirley Caesar, pastor and gospel recording artist
 Carolina Chocolate Drops, folk band who cite their hometown as Durham
 Anthony Roth Costanzo, countertenor known for his performance as the title role of the opera Akhnaten (opera)
 Crystal Cox, track and field athlete; member of national team for the 2004 Athens Summer Olympics; contestant on reality TV show Survivor: Gabon
 Roger Lee Craig, Major League Baseball pitcher and manager 
 John Darnielle, musician and novelist best known as the primary (and often solitary) member of the American band the Mountain Goats, for which he is the writer, composer, guitarist, pianist, and vocalist
 Betty Davis, funk and soul singer
 Reverend Gary Davis, musician
 The Duffer Brothers, creators of the Netflix series Stranger Things
 Benjamin Newton Duke, tobacco, textile, and energy industrialist and philanthropist
 James Buchanan Duke, industrialist, founder of The Duke Endowment and Duke University 
 Victor Dzau, scientist and academic
 Sylvan Esso, grammy-nominated dance and electronic music duo
 Rapsody (Marlanna Evans), Grammy-nominated female rapper
 Pura Fé, Native American singer
 Rick Ferrell, Major League Baseball catcher; member of the National Baseball Hall of Fame
 John Wesley Fletcher, pastor
 Tate Fogleman, NASCAR driver
 Nnenna Freelon, jazz singer/composer
 Philip Freelon (1953–2019), architect, designer of the National Museum of African American History and Culture
 Penny Fuller, award-winning actress in numerous Broadway, film, and television productions
Julian Gamble (born 1989), basketball player in the Israeli Basketball Premier League
 David Garrard, NFL quarterback from 2002 to 2013
 David Gergen, advisor to presidents Ford, Reagan, and Clinton
 Heather Gordon (born 1967), artist
 John H. Hager, former Virginia lieutenant governor (1998–2002) and the father-in-law of former First Daughter Jenna Bush Hager
 Mary Katharine Ham, Conservative journalist; grew up in Durham 
 Michael Hardt, philosopher and theorist of globalization, politics and culture 
Jay Huff, college basketball player for Virginia Cavaliers
 Brandon Hargest, singer for Jump5
 Brittany Hargest, singer for Jump5
 Heather Havrilesky, author, essayist, and humorist raised in Durham 
 Biff Henderson, Late Show with David Letterman comedian and television personality
 Wilbur Hobby, labor leader and former president of the North Carolina AFL-CIO
 Alexander Isley, designer and educator
 Fredric Jameson, literary critic and Marxist political theorist
 Big Daddy Kane, hip-hop artist and actor
 John P. Kee, pastor and gospel recording artist
 Stuart Krohn (born 1962), professional rugby union player
 Mike Krzyzewski, head coach of the Duke men's basketball team and former head coach of Team USA
 Patrick Kypson, professional tennis player
 Mur Lafferty, podcaster and writer
 Caitlin Linney, singer/songwriter
 John D. Loudermilk, songwriter ("Tobacco Road", "Then You Can Tell Me Goodbye")
 John Lucas II, NBA player and coach
 David Lynch, film and TV director; lived in Durham as a child; parents met at Duke University
 John Malachi, jazz pianist
 Crystal Mangum, accuser in the 2006 Duke lacrosse case, who was later found guilty of fatally stabbing her boyfriend
 Leo Mangum, Major League Baseball pitcher
 John H. Manning, lawyer, officer and Adjutant General of North Carolina
 Pigmeat Markham, comic actor and novelty musician
 Doug Marlette, Pulitzer Prize-winning cartoonist; lived in Durham as a child
 Branford Marsalis, resident of Durham for several years. The Branford Marsalis Quartet's 2006 album Braggtown was titled after Braggtown Baptist Church, located in northeastern Durham, just north of Highways 70/85.
 Frank Matthews, drug trafficker during the late 1960s and early 1970s
 Tracy McGrady, attended Mount Zion Christian Academy his senior year, NBA player
 Clyde McPhatter, singer/songwriter, founding member of The Drifters
 LeRoi Moore of the Dave Matthews Band, contemporary jazz musician
 Anita Morris, actress (Ruthless People, The Hotel New Hampshire, nominated for a Tony for her work in Nine)
 The Mountain Goats, indie rock band
 Pauli Murray (1910–1985), civil rights and women's activist, attorney, author, poet and priest, lived here as a child with grandparents; in 1977 was the first black woman to be ordained as an Episcopal priest; in 2012 was named as an Episcopal saint (one of its "Holy Women, Holy Men")
 Link Neal, YouTuber with Rhett McLaughlin for the channels Rhett & Link & Good Mythical Morning
 Mike Nifong, Durham County district attorney disbarred in 2006 for actions in Duke University lacrosse case that year
 David Noel, NBA player for the Milwaukee Bucks
 Wye Oak, musical duo composed of Jenn Wasner and Andy Stack
 Ike Opara, Major League Soccer defender for Sporting Kansas City
 Robert Martin Patterson, United States Army soldier and Medal of Honor recipient
 Sidney Powell, prosecutor and attorney
 Brian Roberts, Major League Baseball player, second baseman for the Baltimore Orioles
 Leah Roberts, former North Carolina State University student who abruptly left Durham in March 2000 and has remained missing ever since
 Rodney Rogers, NBA power forward from 1993 to 2005 
 Ben Ruffin, civil rights activist, educator, and businessman
 Don Schlitz, songwriter (Kenny Rogers's "The Gambler")
 James E. Shepard (1875–1947), educator, founder and president of North Carolina College for Negroes (now North Carolina Central University)
 Robert K. Steel, former Undersecretary of the Treasury
 Jamie Stewart, art-pop musician best known as the frontman of Xiu Xiu
 Andre Leon Talley, (1948-2022) Vogue editor, fashion luminary, and current judge of America's Next Top Model
 Grady Tate, American musician and singer
 Justin Tornow, dancer and choreographer
 Emilie Townes, dean of Vanderbilt Divinity School, former president of the American Academy of Religion
 Teresa Trull, singer, songwriter, and record producer
 LeRoy T. Walker (1918–2012), former United States Olympic president; former chancellor of North Carolina Central University (NCCU)
 Dewayne Washington, NFL cornerback from 1994 to 2005
 Seth Wescott, Olympic champion snowboarder
Josh Whitesell, Major League Baseball first baseman of the Arizona Diamondbacks
 T. J. Warren, NBA player for the Indiana Pacers
Bull City Red (birth name George Washington), blues musician
 Harvey D. Williams (1930–2020), African-American U.S. Army major general
 Walter Lee Williams, one of the FBI Ten Most Wanted Fugitives
 Morgan Wootten, head basketball coach at DeMatha Catholic High School and member of the Basketball Hall of Fame
 James B. Wyngaarden, American physician, researcher and academic administrator.
 Freekey Zekey (Ezekiel Giles), rapper; spent almost three years in jail at Durham Correctional Center on drug charges before being released on November 20, 2006

Sister cities
Durham's sister cities are:

 Arusha, Tanzania
 Celaya, Mexico
 Durham, County Durham, England, United Kingdom
 Kavala, Greece
 Kostroma, Russia
 Sibiu, Romania
 Tilarán, Costa Rica
 Toyama, Japan
 Zhuzhou, China

See also

 List of municipalities in North Carolina
 Norfolk Southern–Gregson Street Overpass
 Triangle J Council of Governments
 List of U.S. cities with large Black populations

Notes

References

Further reading

External links

 
 
 Durham Convention and Visitors Bureau
 Greater Durham Chamber of Commerce

 
Cities in North Carolina
County seats in North Carolina
Duke family
Planned cities in the United States
Populated places established in 1853
Research Triangle
Cities in Durham County, North Carolina
Cities in Orange County, North Carolina
Cities in Wake County, North Carolina